Županjevac (Serbian Cyrillic: Жупанјевац) is a village in Šumadija and Western Serbia (Šumadija), in the municipality of Rekovac (Region of Levač), lying at , at the elevation of 365 m. According to the 2002 census, the village had 464 citizens.

External links
 Levac Online
 Article about Županjevac
 Pictures from Županjevac

Populated places in Pomoravlje District
Šumadija